The twelfth season of The Real Housewives of Beverly Hills, an American reality television series, aired on Bravo from on May 11, 2022 to October 26, 2022, and is primarily filmed in Beverly Hills, California. 

The season focuses on the personal and professional lives of Kyle Richards, Lisa Rinna, Erika Jayne, Dorit Kemsley, Garcelle Beauvais, Crystal Kung   Minkoff, Sutton Stracke and Diana Jenkins. The season consisted of 24 episodes.

The season’s executive producers are Andrew Hoegl, Barrie Bernstein, Lisa Shannon, Pam Healy and Andy Cohen.

The season marked the final appearance of Lisa Rinna after announcing her exit in January 2023.

Cast
In December of 2021, it was confirmed that the entire cast of the eleventh season would return for the twelfth season, and that joining them would be new housewife Diana Jenkins and new friend of the housewives Sheree Zampino.

Jenkins does not physically appear at the reunion, instead appearing virtually.
Kathy Hilton is seated on the left couch between her sister, Richards, and Beauvais.

Episodes

References

2021 American television seasons
Beverly Hills (season 12)